Kabatiella lini is a species of fungus in the family Saccotheciaceae. It is a  plant pathogen that infects flax.

References

Fiber plant diseases
Dothideales
Fungi described in 1921